A grave field is a prehistoric cemetery, typically of Bronze Age and Iron Age Europe.

Grave fields are distinguished from necropoleis by the former's lack of remaining above-ground structures, buildings, or grave markers.

Types
Grave fields can be classified by type of burial custom:
tumulus (kurgan) fields
flat graves
row graves: grave fields arranged in rows
ossuaries
shaft tombs
urnfields

Celtic grave fields
Hallstatt culture
Kinding-Ilbling, Eichstätt district, Germany
La Tène culture
Münsingen-Rain, Berne, Switzerland

Northern Europe

Scandinavia
Nordic Bronze Age
 Jordbro Grave Field, Jordbro, Sweden
Sammallahdenmäki, Finland
Ekornavallen, Falköping Municipality, Sweden
Gettlinge, Öland, Sweden
Itzehoe tumulus, Germany
Vendel period
Vendel, Uppland, Sweden
Greby, Bohuslän, Sweden
Smålandsstenar, Gislaved Municipality, Sweden
Trullhalsar, Gotland, Sweden
Blomsholm, Bohuslän, Sweden
Högom, Medelpad, Sweden
Vätteryd, Skåne County, Sweden
Hjortahammar, Blekinge, Sweden
Li, Halland, Sweden
Valsgärde, Uppsala County, Sweden
Viking Age
Järvsta, Gävle, Sweden

Northern European Lowlands
Jastorf culture
Mühlen Eichsen, Schwerin, Germany

Alemannic grave fields

Alemannic grave fields date to the 5th to 8th century. Before the middle of the 5th century, grave fields are small, often including less than five graves, probably corresponding to a single homestead or family. The sparsity of graves in the early period may suggest partial cremation. In the mid- to late 5th century, burial customs appear to change, with the introduction of larger row-grave fields.

Grave fields are often arranged on elevated ground outside settlements. The arrangement of graves is often east to west — the head of the body placed on the western end, looking east.

Until the beginning of the 6th century, these row graves are accompanied by more prestigious single graves including precious grave goods. Quast (1997) assumes that the 5th-century change in burial practice was due to a renewed influx of Elbe Germanic settlers (Danube Swabians displaced by Gothic migration).

Male graves often include weapons — in the mid-5th century typically a Francisca axe, besides spathas and seaxes. Female graves often include jewellery, such as bracelets, ear-rings and fibulae.

Large Alemannic row grave fields have been excavated at Lauchheim, Gammertingen, Weingarten, Ravensburg, all in Swabia, the one in Ravensburg including over 1,000 graves dating to between 450 and 710. The field in Sasbach includes over 2,000 graves. Mengen has over 1,000 graves.

Alemannic graves appear south of the Rhine, in the Swiss Plateau, from the 6th century. Alemannic colonization of the Swiss plateau apparently took place from the Basel area, since the number of graves there declines simultaneously. Significant influx of Alemannic settlers to the Swiss plateau begins only in the 7th century. Grave fields from this period include one at Elgg-Ettenbühl near Winterthur; with 340 graves it is the largest field south of the High Rhine.

Christianization of the Alemanni during the 7th century brings about the end of the grave field traditions. The dead from this period were buried in graveyards near churches. Prestigious graves of local nobility appear to have resisted the Christianization of burial customs into the 8th century, possibly until the 786 decree of Charlemagne outlawing pagan burial.

See also
Burial mound
Chariot burial
Megalithic tomb
Ship burial
Viking funeral

References

Die Alamannen. ed. Archäologisches Landesmuseum Baden-Württemberg, Stuttgart 1997.
Dieter Quast: Vom Einzelgrab zum Friedhof. Beginn der Reihengräbersitte im 5. Jahrhundert.
Ingo Stork: Als Persönlichkeit ins Jenseits. Bestattungssitte und Grabraub als Kontrast.
Michael Hoeper: Alamannische Besiedlungsgeschichte im Breisgau, Reihengräberfelder und Gemarkungsgrenzen. In: Römer und Alamannen im Breisgau. Studien zur Besiedlungsgeschichte in Spätantike und frühem Mittelalter. Sigmaringen 1994. (In dr Reihe Archäologie und Geschichte. Freiburger Forschungen zum ersten Jahrtausend in Südwestdeutschland. Rüsgä vum Hans Ulrich Nuber, Karl Schmid, Heiko Steuer un em Thomas Zotz.)

Cemeteries
European archaeology
Archaeology of death
Indo-European archaeological sites
Bronze Age Europe
Iron Age Europe